Violet Apisah (born 11 February 2000) is an Australian-Papuan tennis player.

Tennis career
In 2016, Apisah won the WTA Future Stars Under-16 Tournament, which was an exhibition tournament in Singapore during the 2016 WTA Finals.

On the junior tour, Apisah has a career high ITF junior combined ranking of 24, achieved on 26 March 2018.

In 2018, Apisah reached the final of the 2018 Australian Open girls' doubles event, partnering Lulu Sun.

Apisah made her Fed Cup debut for Pacific Oceania in 2019.

Personal life
Apisah is the niece of Abigail and Marcia Tere-Apisah, who are also tennis players. Her sister, Patricia, is also a junior tennis player.

Junior Grand Slam finals

Doubles

ITF junior finals

Singles (10–2)

Doubles (12–4)

References

External links
 
 
 

2000 births
Living people
Australian female tennis players
Papua New Guinean female tennis players
People from the National Capital District (Papua New Guinea)
Tennis players from Sydney